St Gerard's School is a lay Catholic co-educational independent day school in Bray, County Wicklow, Ireland.  A fee-charging school, it is administered by a Board of Governors as a charitable trust. As of 2019, the student population was about 770 including its Senior School, Junior School, and the Montessori.

In 2019, St. Gerard's School was named top school in County Wicklow, and 29th in Ireland.

History
John James founded the school in 1918. After completing his university degree in 1904 he converted to the Roman Catholic faith. His vision of education emphasized "the dignity of each individual and the development of the whole person". The school is named after Gerard Majella, patron saint of the school.

Controversy 
In March 2021 in the midst of the Covid-19 pandemic, twenty teachers from the St. Gerard's Primary and Secondary School received vaccinations from the Beacon Hospital. At that time, less than 20% of the Irish population had been vaccinated, with many vulnerable and elderly people waiting to be vaccinated. The head of the Irish Health Service and the Minister for Justice expressed "frustration" at the actions of the Beacon Hospital which violated policies regarding the use of surplus vaccines. Micheál Martin, Ireland's Taoiseach, labelled the hospital's actions "repugnant". The Irish Times noted that the children of the chief executive of the Beacon Hospital attend St. Gerard's.

Notable alumni

 Charley Boorman, actor
 Jack Conan, Ireland rugby union international
 Emma Hannigan, author and blogger
 John Harbison, first State Pathologist of Ireland
 Andrew Hozier-Byrne, musician
 Louis le Brocquy, artist
 Sir Helenus Milmo, QC, lawyer and High Court judge
 Frank O'Reilly, Irish banker, businessman
 Tony Smurfit, CEO of Smurfit Kappa
 Elena Tice, dual Ireland women's cricket and field hockey international

See also
 Education in the Republic of Ireland

References

External links
 

1918 establishments in Ireland
Catholic secondary schools in the Republic of Ireland
Educational institutions established in 1918
Education in Bray, County Wicklow
Private schools in the Republic of Ireland
Schools in County Wicklow